The Licia Albanese-Puccini Foundation is a musical organisation founded in 1974 whose scope is to provide assistance to young American and international artists by means of scholarships, study grants, and master classes.

Since its creation and for the past 30 years, the foundation has assisted hundreds of young artists, singers, instrumentalists, conductors, and composers who have appeared in opera houses throughout the United States and the world, including the Metropolitan Opera and New York City Opera.

The foundation is named after the Italian soprano Licia Albanese and the composer Giacomo Puccini.

References

1974 establishments in New York (state)
Organizations established in 1974
Arts foundations based in the United States
Music organizations based in the United States
Organizations based in New York City